George Colton may refer to:

 George Radcliffe Colton (1865–1916), governor of Puerto Rico
 George Colton (Maryland politician) (1817–1898), American politician, printer and newspaperman

See also
 G. G. Coulton (1858–1947), British historian